SVD may stand for:

Geography
 Argyle International Airport (IATA airport code SVD) on Saint Vincent island

Mathematics
 Singular value decomposition of a matrix in mathematics

Media
 Svenska Dagbladet (SvD), a Swedish newspaper

Medicine
 Spontaneous vaginal delivery, a type of birth
 Swine vesicular disease
 Small vessel disease, of blood vessels

Popular culture
 Sander van Doorn (b. 1979), Dutch  DJ

Religion
 Society of the Divine Word (Societas Verbi Divini), a Roman Catholic religious order

Science and technology
 Saturation vapor density
 Semi-virtual diskette, emulating a floppy drive
 Simultaneous voice and data, in telecommunications

Weapons 

 SVD (rifle) (Russian: Snayperskaya Vintovka Dragunova), a Soviet marksman rifle.